Transit is a 2018 German drama film written and directed by Christian Petzold. It is based on Anna Seghers's 1944 novel of the same name and adapted to be set in the present. The film follows a refugee (Franz Rogowski) who impersonates a dead writer in an attempt to flee a fascist state. The film was a critical success and was selected to compete for the Golden Bear in the main competition section at the 68th Berlin International Film Festival.

Plot
Georg, a German political refugee, barely escapes arrest in occupied present-day Paris, France. He attempts to deliver a letter to a famous writer named Franz Weidel but discovers that Weidel has killed himself in a hotel room. He takes Weidel's last manuscript and identity documents, which promise him safe harbor in Mexico. He attempts to flee to Marseille via train with his injured friend, Heinz, but Heinz dies en route. In Marseille, he brings news of Heinz's death to his wife Melissa and son Driss, who live in the city illegally. Georg befriends Driss.

When Georg attempts to turn in Weidel's papers to the Mexican consul, he is mistaken for Weidel and impersonates him, and is given transit visas for himself and Weidel's wife, Marie. He learns that Marie had left Weidel but wishes to reunite with him and has been waiting in Marseille so they can flee together. Driss has an asthma attack, and Georg fetches a doctor, Richard, to care for him. Georg meets the doctor's mistress, who he learns is Marie.

Richard wishes to flee but is consumed by guilt over abandoning Marie. However, when Georg offers her a transit visa, Richard goes ahead and tries to board a departing ship but is forced to give up his spot for French soldiers. Georg and Marie develop a romantic relationship. He wrestles with whether to tell her the truth about her husband, coming close to doing so but being unable to do so because she so adamantly believes him to be alive. He learns that Melissa and Driss have fled and witnesses the suicide of a fellow refugee he had known as an acquaintance.

Georg and Marie hail a taxi for the harbor to board their ship, the Montreal, but Georg exits, claiming he has forgotten something. He goes to Richard and sells him his place on the ship. While recounting his story to a bartender, to whom he entrusts Weidel's manuscript, he sees a woman who looks like Marie, but she disappears. He goes to the port to confirm that she boarded but is told that the Montreal hit a mine and sank with no survivors. He returns to the bar, where he waits for Marie as the French police start sweeping the city to purge it of refugees.

Cast
 Franz Rogowski as Georg
 Paula Beer as Marie Weidel
 Godehard Giese as Richard
 Lilien Batman as Driss, the boy
 Maryam Zaree as Melissa, Driss' mother
 Barbara Auer as Woman with the two dogs
 Matthias Brandt as the barkeeper (and narrator)
 Ronald Kukulies as Heinz
 Antoine Oppenheim as George Binnet
 Sebastian Hülk as Paul
 Emilie de Preissac as the maid at Herr Weidel's place
 Justus von Dohnányi as the conductor refugee
 Alex Brendemühl as the Mexican consul
 Trystan Pütter as the American consul

Reception
The consensus reads "Transit lives up to its title with a challenging drama that captures characters - and puts the audience - in a state of flux and exerts an unsettling pull."

References

External links
 
 
 
 

2018 films
2018 drama films
2010s German-language films
2010s French-language films
Films about anti-fascism
German alternate history films
German drama films
Films about illegal immigration
Films about refugees
Films about writers
Films based on German novels
Films directed by Christian Petzold
Films set in Marseille
Films set in Paris
Films set in the 2010s
2010s German films